Shanshan Town is a rural town in Louxing District of Loudi City, Hunan Province, People's Republic of China.

History
In 2015, Xiaobi Township was merged into Shanshan Town.

Administrative division
The town is divided into 18 villages and 1 community, the following areas: 
 Enkou Community
 Shanshan Village
 Huaxi Village
 Tangping Village
 Tianwan Village
 Jiyun Village
 Yaozi Village
 Lisong Village
 Wanle Village
 Mushan Village
 Siji Village
 Quanfu Village
 Tianping Village
 Batang Village
 Ranpu Village
 Leshan Village
 Shidi Village
 Shilong Village
 Shiyuan Village

Geography
The town shares a border with Shijing Town to the west, Fanjiang Town to the east, Hutian Town of Xiangxiang to the northeast, Shuangjiang Township to the northwest, and Lianbin Subdistrict to the south.

Transportation

Provincial Highway
Provincial Highway S209 is a north–south highway in the town.

Expressway
Changsha-Shaoshan-Loudi Expressway passes across the township east to west.

Railway
The Luoyang–Zhanjiang Railway, from Luoyang City, Henan Province to Zhanjiang City, Guangdong Province, through the town.

References

Divisions of Louxing District